Clonmel Junction Festival is an annual festival held in the town of Clonmel, Ireland. The festival starts on the first weekend of July and runs for seven days. It is a multi-discipline arts festival with theatre, dance, music, food, and visual arts.

Clonmel Junction Festival was established in 2001. The festival has been described as punching well above its weight for a town with no committed performing arts venue. The Junction Dome, a geodesic dome acted as a livestreaming venue for the 2021 festival on Mick Delahunty Square in the center of town.

History

Early years

Clonmel Junction Festival was established in 2001 by the now defunct Galloglass Theatre Company. It featured four theatre shows, one comedy performance and a small number of Traditional Music performances in local pubs.

In 2002, the festival expanded its format to include Rock Music featuring Damien Rice and Kíla. A participation program was also introduced this year. The program involved local school children creating street art that was put on display for the duration of the festival. This has since become annual program which engages over 300 children every year.

2003 featured the premiere of Des Dillon's Teac a Bloc. This was also the last year that the festival was run by the Galloglass Theatre Company.

Independence

2004 saw Clonmel Junction Festival became an independent organization run by a board of directors. The success of festival lead to its expansion in 2005, increasing from a six-day event to nine-day event.

2006 saw the festival bring Nofit State Circus to Clonmel for five sell-out shows. As part of this year festival, there was also a celebration of newly established Polish community within Clonmel, in a mini Polish Festival.

The 10th Clonmel Junction Festival took place in 2010, the focus of the event shifted to circus. The festival featured circus acts from Ireland and abroad, including Fossett's Circus and Les Parfaits Inconnus. The music line up included Cathy Davey, Republic of Loose and Mick Flannery. It also featured the premiere of Me Seeing You 2, by the Iseli Chiodi Dance Company commissioned by the Festival, South Tipperary Arts Office and The Excel Centre.

Artistic Projects 

The Participation Programme made it possible to transform Clonmel into a "forest" in 2006. The villages in the forest were set up by the programme. Several acts brought their villages with them in their own way. There was also a celebration of the emerging Polish village within Clonmel, in a mini Polish Festival.

Followed by the success of the Space Time Machine in 2007 the Festival organized Da Fair deadly Pirateswarm, 2008 youth project. The same year a collaboration was organized between Body Mind & Soul, visiting artists from Malawi and Maslow, a young local band. Sensazione, an eco-theatrical fun fair was the headline event in 2008. Along with this several other theatre world premières took place during the nine days including 'Raw', a creation of the aerial dance company Fidget Feet in collaboration with the festival and made possible by funding from the Arts Council.

Highlights over the years
2001 – Cracked by Quare Hawks Theatre Company
2002 – Gorilla Goes Beautiful by Lieber Gorilla, Moze Fan Fan, Damien Rice
2003 – The premiere of Des Dillon's Teach a Bloc 
2004 – Tom Crean Antarctic Explorer by Aidan Dooley,
Romeo and Juliet by The Daylight Players
2005 – KT Tunstall, Yair Dalal, Máirtín O'Connor
2006 – Nofit State Circus, Liam Clancy and Odetta
2007 – The Syringa Tree, Foy Vance, Mary Black
2008 – Nicole and Martin, Paul Brady, The Blizzards, Fidget Feet
2009 – Cafe Carte Blanche
2010 – Cathy Davey, Republic of Loose, Kíla, Mick Flannery

2021 – Jerry Fish, Mick Flannery, Gavin Glass, Fishamble, and local playwright and actress, Eve O'Mahoney

References

Sources 
 Irish Newspaper Archives  – Retrieved 25 April 2009
The Festival, as presented by the official Irish Tourism body.

External links 
 Clonmel Junction Festival
 Irishtimes.com Slideshow

Clonmel
Music festivals in Ireland
Recurring events established in 2001
2001 establishments in Ireland